2022 EFA League Cup was the first edition of the EFA Cup, an annual knockout football competition for Egyptian Premier League clubs.

Group stage

Knockout stage
All times are local

Semifinals

Third place play-off

Final

References

2021–22 in Egyptian football
Football in Egypt